Medgar Wiley Evers (July 2, 1925June 12, 1963) was an American civil rights activist and the NAACP's first field secretary in Mississippi, who was murdered by Byron De La Beckwith. Evers, a decorated U.S. Army combat veteran who had served in World War II, was engaged in efforts to overturn segregation at the University of Mississippi, end the segregation of public facilities, and expand opportunities for African Americans including the enforcement of voting rights.

A college graduate, Evers became active in the Civil Rights Movement in the 1950s. Following the 1954 ruling of the United States Supreme Court in Brown v. Board of Education that segregated public schools were unconstitutional, Evers challenged the segregation of the state-supported public University of Mississippi, applying to law school there. He also worked for voting rights, economic opportunity, access to public facilities, and other changes in the segregated society. Evers was awarded the 1963 NAACP Spingarn Medal.

Evers was murdered in 1963 at his home in Jackson, Mississippi, now the Medgar and Myrlie Evers Home National Monument, by Byron De La Beckwith, a member of the White Citizens' Council in Jackson. This group was formed in 1954 in Mississippi to resist the integration of schools and civil rights activism. As a veteran, Evers was buried with full military honors at Arlington National Cemetery. His murder and the resulting trials inspired civil rights protests, and his life and death inspired numerous works of art, music, and film. Although all-white juries failed to reach verdicts in Beckwith's first two trials in the 1960s, he was convicted in 1994 based on new evidence.

Medgar's widow, Myrlie Evers, became a noted activist in her own right, serving as national chair of the NAACP. In 1969 his brother Charles became the first African American to be elected mayor of a Mississippi city in the post-Reconstruction era.

Early life
Evers was born on July 2, 1925, in Decatur, Mississippi, the third of five children (including elder brother Charles Evers) of Jesse (Wright) and James Evers. The family included Jesse's two children from a previous marriage. The Evers family owned a small farm and James also worked at a sawmill. Evers and his siblings walked  a day to attend segregated schools; eventually Medgar earned his high school diploma.

Evers served in the United States Army during World War II from 1943 to 1945. He was sent to the European Theater where he participated in the Normandy landings in June 1944. After the end of the war, Evers was honorably discharged as a sergeant.

In 1948, Evers enrolled at Alcorn Agricultural and Mechanical College (a historically black college, now Alcorn State University), majoring in business administration. He also competed on the debate, football, and track teams, sang in the choir, and was junior class president. He earned his Bachelor of Arts in 1952.

On December 24, 1951, he married classmate Myrlie Beasley. Together they had three children: Darrell Kenyatta, Reena Denise, and James Van Dyke Evers.

Activism
The couple moved to Mound Bayou, Mississippi, a town developed by African Americans, where Evers became a salesman for T. R. M. Howard's Magnolia Mutual Life Insurance Company.
Evers was also president of the Regional Council of Negro Leadership (RCNL), which began to organize actions for civil rights; Evers helped organize the RCNL's boycott of gasoline stations that denied blacks the use of the stations' restrooms.
Evers and his brother Charles attended the RCNL's annual conferences in Mound Bayou between 1952 and 1954, which drew crowds of 10,000 or more.

In 1954, following the U.S. Supreme Court decision that segregated public schools were unconstitutional, Evers applied to the state-supported University of Mississippi Law School, but his application was rejected because of his race. He submitted his application as part of a test case by the NAACP.

On November 24, 1954, Evers was named as the NAACP's first field secretary for Mississippi. In this position, he helped organize boycotts and set up new local chapters of the NAACP. He was involved with James Meredith's efforts to enroll in the University of Mississippi in the early 1960s.

Evers also encouraged Dr. Gilbert Mason Sr. in his organizing of the Biloxi wade-ins from 1959 to 1963, protests against segregation of the city's public beaches on the Mississippi Gulf Coast. Evers conducted actions to help integrate Jackson's privately owned buses and tried to integrate the public parks. He led voter registration drives, and used boycotts to integrate Leake County schools and the Mississippi State Fair.

Evers's civil rights leadership, along with his investigative work, made him a target of white supremacists. Following the Brown v. Board of Education decision, local whites founded the White Citizens' Council in Mississippi, and numerous local chapters were started, to resist the integration of schools and facilities. In the weeks before Evers was killed, he encountered new levels of hostility. His public investigations into the 1955 lynching of Chicago teenager Emmett Till in Mississippi, and his vocal support of Clyde Kennard, had made him a prominent black leader. On May 28, 1963, a Molotov cocktail was thrown into the carport of his home. On June 7, 1963, Evers was nearly run down by a car after he came out of the NAACP office in Jackson, Mississippi.

Assassination

Medgar Evers lived with the constant threat of death. A large white supremacist population and the Ku Klux Klan were present in Jackson and its suburbs. The risk was so high that before his death, Evers and his wife Myrlie had trained their children on what to do in case of a shooting, bombing or other kind of attack on their lives. Evers, who was regularly followed home by at least two FBI cars and one police car, arrived at his home on the morning of his death without an escort. None of his usual protection was present, for reasons unspecified by the FBI or local police. There has been speculation that many members of the police force at the time were members of the Klan.

In the early morning of Wednesday, June 12, 1963, just hours after President John F. Kennedy's nationally televised Civil Rights Address, Evers pulled into his driveway after returning from a meeting with NAACP lawyers. Evers's family had worried for his safety that day; Evers himself had warned his wife that he felt in greater danger than usual.

Emerging from his car and carrying NAACP T-shirts that read "Jim Crow Must Go", Evers was struck in the back with a bullet fired from an Eddystone Enfield 1917 rifle; the bullet passed through his heart. Initially thrown to the ground by the impact of the shot, Evers rose and staggered  before collapsing outside his front door. His wife, Myrlie, was the first to find him.

He was taken to the local hospital in Jackson, where he was initially refused entry because of his race. His family explained who he was and he was admitted; he died in the hospital 50 minutes later. He was 37 years old. Evers was the first black man to be admitted to an all-white hospital in Mississippi. Mourned nationally, Evers was buried on June 19 in Arlington National Cemetery, where he received full military honors before a crowd of more than 3,000.

After Evers was assassinated, an estimated 5,000 people marched from the Masonic Temple on Lynch Street to the Collins Funeral Home on North Farish Street in Jackson. Allen Johnson, Reverend Martin Luther King Jr. and other civil rights leaders led the procession. The Mississippi police came to the non-violent protest armed with riot gear and rifles. While tensions were initially high in the stand-off between police and marchers, both in Jackson and in many similar marches around the state, leaders of the movement maintained non-violence among their followers.

Trials
On June 21, 1963, Byron De La Beckwith, a fertilizer salesman and member of the Citizens' Council (and later of the Ku Klux Klan), was arrested for Evers's murder. District Attorney and future governor Bill Waller prosecuted De La Beckwith. All-white juries in February and April 1964 deadlocked on De La Beckwith's guilt and failed to reach a verdict. At the time, most black people were still disenfranchised by Mississippi's constitution and voter registration practices; this meant they were also excluded from juries, which were drawn from the pool of registered voters.

Myrlie Evers did not give up the fight for the conviction of her husband's killer. She waited until a new judge had been assigned in the county to take her case against De La Beckwith back into the courtroom. In 1994, De La Beckwith was prosecuted by the state based on new evidence. Bobby DeLaughter was the prosecutor. During the trial, the body of Evers was exhumed for an autopsy.

De La Beckwith was convicted of murder on February 5, 1994, after having lived as a free man for much of the three decades following the killing. He had been imprisoned from 1977 to 1980 on separate charges: conspiring to murder A. I. Botnick. In 1997, De La Beckwith appealed his conviction in the Evers case, but the Mississippi Supreme Court upheld it and the U.S. Supreme Court declined to hear it. He died at age 80 in prison on January 21, 2001.

Legacy

Evers was memorialized by leading Mississippi and national authors both black and white: James Baldwin, Margaret Walker, Eudora Welty, and Anne Moody. In 1963, Evers was posthumously awarded the Spingarn Medal by the NAACP. In 1969, Medgar Evers College was established in Brooklyn, New York, as part of the City University of New York.

Evers's widow Myrlie Evers co-wrote the 1967 book For Us, the Living with William Peters. In 1983, a television movie was made based on the book. Celebrating Evers's life and career, it starred Howard Rollins Jr. and Irene Cara as Medgar and Myrlie Evers, airing on PBS. The film won the Writers Guild of America award for Best Adapted Drama.

In 1969, a community pool in the Central District neighborhood of Seattle, Washington, was named after Evers, honoring his life.

On June 28, 1992, the city of Jackson, Mississippi, erected a statue in honor of Evers. All of Delta Drive (part of U.S. Highway 49) in Jackson was renamed in Evers's honor. In December 2004, the Jackson City Council changed the name of the city's airport to Jackson–Medgar Wiley Evers International Airport in his honor.

His widow Myrlie Evers became a noted activist in her own right, eventually serving as national chairperson of the NAACP. Myrlie also founded the Medgar Evers Institute in 1998, with the initial goal of preserving and advancing the legacy of Medgar Evers's life's work. Anticipating the commemoration of the 50th anniversary of the assassination of Medgar Evers and recognizing the international leadership role of Myrlie Evers, the Institute's board of directors changed the organization's name to the Medgar and Myrlie Evers Institute.

Medgar's brother Charles Evers returned to Jackson in July 1963, and served briefly with the NAACP in his slain brother's place. He remained involved in Mississippi civil rights activities for many years, and in 1969, was the first African-American mayor elected in the state. He died on July 22, 2020, aged 97.

On the 40th anniversary of Evers's assassination, hundreds of civil rights veterans, government officials, and students from across the country gathered around his grave site at Arlington National Cemetery to celebrate his life and legacy. Barry Bradford and three students—Sharmistha Dev, Jajah Wu, and Debra Siegel, formerly of Adlai E. Stevenson High School in Lincolnshire, Illinois—planned and hosted the commemoration in his honor. Evers was the subject of the students' research project.

The ship was christened by Myrlie Evers-Williams on November 12, 2011.

In June 2013, a statue of Evers was erected at his alma mater, Alcorn State University, to commemorate the 50th anniversary of his death. Alumni and guests from around the world gathered to recognize his contributions to American society.

Evers was honored in a tribute at Arlington National Cemetery on the 50th anniversary of his death. Former President Bill Clinton, Attorney General Eric Holder, Navy Secretary Ray Mabus, Senator Roger Wicker, and NAACP President Benjamin Jealous all spoke commemorating Evers. Evers's widow, Myrlie Evers-Williams, spoke of his contributions to the advancement of civil rights:

Medgar was a man who never wanted adoration, who never wanted to be in the limelight. He was a man who saw a job that needed to be done and he answered the call and the fight for freedom, dignity and justice not just for his people but all people.

He was identified as a Freedom hero by The My Hero Project.

In 2017, the Medgar and Myrlie Evers House was named as a National Historic Landmark. In 2019, the site was designated a National Monument.

In popular culture

Music 
Musician Bob Dylan wrote his song "Only a Pawn in Their Game" about the assassination on July 2, 1963, on what would have been Evers's 38th birthday. Nina Simone wrote and sang "Mississippi Goddam" about the Evers case. Phil Ochs referred to Evers in the song "Love Me, I'm a Liberal" and wrote the songs "Another Country" and "Too Many Martyrs" (also titled "The Ballad of Medgar Evers") in response to the killing. Malvina Reynolds referenced Evers's murder in her song, "It Isn't Nice". Matthew Jones and the Student Nonviolent Coordinating Committee Freedom Singers recorded a version of the latter song. Wadada Leo Smith's album Ten Freedom Summers contains a track called "Medgar Evers: A Love-Voice of a Thousand Years' Journey for Liberty and Justice". Jackson C. Frank's self-titled debut album, released in 1965, also includes a reference to Medgar Evers in the song "Don't Look Back".

Essays and books 
Eudora Welty's short story, "Where Is the Voice Coming From?", in which the speaker is the imagined assassin of Medgar Evers, was published in The New Yorker in July 1963.

Attorney Robert DeLaughter wrote a first-person narrative article entitled "Mississippi Justice" published in Reader's Digest about his experiences as state prosecutor in the murder trial. He added to this account in a book, Never Too Late: A Prosecutor's Story of Justice in the Medgar Evers Case (2001).

Film 
Evers was portrayed by Howard Rollins in the 1983 television film For Us the Living: The Medgar Evers Story.

The 1996 film Ghosts of Mississippi, directed by Rob Reiner, explores the 1994 trial of De La Beckwith in which prosecutor DeLaughter of the Hinds County District Attorney's office secured a conviction in state court. Beckwith and DeLaughter were played by James Woods and Alec Baldwin, respectively, with Whoopi Goldberg as Myrlie Evers. Medgar was portrayed by James Pickens Jr. The film was based on a book of the same name.

In the documentary film I Am Not Your Negro (2016), Evers is one of three Black activists (the other two are Martin Luther King Jr. and Malcolm X) who are the focus of reminiscences by author James Baldwin, who recounts the circumstances of and his reaction to Evers' assassination.

In the 2011 film The Help, a clip of Evers speaking for civil rights is shown on TV, quickly followed by news of his assassination, and a glimpse of an article by his widow published in Life magazine.

The 2022 film Till depicts Evers (played by Tosin Cole) assisting Mamie Till-Bradley (Danielle Deadwyler) seek justice for the murder of her son, Emmett Till (Jalyn Hall).

Television 

In the third season (1975) episode of Good Times entitled Cousin Cleatus, Michael Evans asks 2 FBI agents who are looking for his mother's nephew in connection with a bank robbery in Georgia which Special Agent is looking for Medgar Evers' killer.

A 2021 episode of Extra History from Extra Credits talks about Evers, his activism, and assassination.

In the 2017 Bojack Horseman episode "Time's Arrow" (Season Four, Episode 11), the character Beatrice Horseman makes a reference to Medgar Evers.

See also
 List of civil rights leaders

References

Further reading
 
Bruce, Catherine Fleming (2016). The Sustainers: Being, Building and Doing Good through Activism in the Sacred Spaces of Civil Rights, Human Rights and Social Movements. Tnovsa LLC. ISBN 9780996219020.

External links

 SNCC Digital Gateway: Medgar Evers, Documentary website created by the SNCC Legacy Project and Duke University, telling the story of the Student Nonviolent Coordinating Committee & grassroots organizing from the inside-out
 JFK First Draft Condolence Letter to Medgar Evers's Widow, June 12, 1963  Shapell Manuscript Foundation
 Audio recording of T. R. M. Howard's eulogy at the memorial service for Medgar Evers, June 15, 1963, Jackson, Mississippi.
 
 Medgar Evers in the U.S. Federal Census American Civil Rights Pioneers
 
 FBI article: Civil Rights in the '60s: Justice for Medgar Evers
 Medgar Evers's FBI file hosted at the Internet Archive
 Medgar Evers Fund Collected Records held at Swarthmore College Peace Collection

1925 births
1963 deaths
1963 murders in the United States
African-American activists
African-American history of Mississippi
Alcorn State Braves football players
Alcorn State University alumni
American terrorism victims
Assassinated American civil rights activists
Burials at Arlington National Cemetery
Deaths by firearm in Mississippi
Ku Klux Klan crimes in Mississippi
Male murder victims
Military personnel from Mississippi
Murdered African-American people
NAACP activists
People from Decatur, Mississippi
People from Mound Bayou, Mississippi
People murdered in Mississippi
Players of American football from Mississippi
Racially motivated violence against African Americans
Spingarn Medal winners
United States Army non-commissioned officers
United States Army personnel of World War II